Sebastian Paweł Janikowski (born March 2, 1978) is a Polish former American football placekicker who played in the National Football League (NFL) for 18 seasons, primarily with the Oakland Raiders. He played college football at Florida State and was selected 17th overall in the 2000 NFL Draft by the Raiders, where he spent all but one season of his professional career. During his final season in the NFL, he played for the Seattle Seahawks.

One of only three NFL placekickers to be selected in the first round of an NFL draft, Janikowski is the Raiders' all-time leading scorer and appeared in more games with the franchise than any other player. He also tied the then-NFL record for the longest successful field goal at 63 yards, which is the third-longest in league history.

Early years
Sebastian Janikowski was born on March 2, 1978, as an only child to Henryk and Halina Janikowski in Wałbrzych, Poland. His father was a professional soccer player, and moved to the United States in the early 1980s in the hopes of reviving his career. Years after Janikowski's father emigrated from Poland, his parents divorced and Henryk married an American citizen. Left at home with just his mother, Janikowski began to excel at soccer himself, and when he was 15, Janikowski earned a spot on the Polish under-17 team.

His father's marriage to an American meant Janikowski could legally emigrate to the United States. He spoke very little English, but learned quickly by taking a three-week night class and by watching television. Janikowski played in only five games for the Orangewood Christian soccer team, but led them to the Class A State Championship game by scoring 15 goals, where they lost to Lakeland Christian on penalty kicks (3–2). Then living in Orlando, Florida with his father and stepmother, Janikowski joined the Orlando Lions, an under-19 soccer club coached by Angelo Rossi. Rossi was also the soccer coach at Seabreeze High School in Daytona Beach, and convinced Henryk that his son would be better off there. Henryk agreed, but was unwilling to move, so Janikowski moved in with Rossi's family.

During his senior year at Seabreeze, Janikowski played both soccer and football after being recruited by the school's football coach. As the team's placekicker, he quickly earned a reputation by kicking four field goals of 50+ yards. One of them was for 60 yards, third-best in Florida high school history. During a practice at Seabreeze High, he kicked an 82-yard field goal. USA Today named Janikowski to its 1996 All-American team. After being heavily recruited by some of the top collegiate football programs, Janikowski decided on Florida State University.

College career

Janikowski attended Florida State University, where he played for coach Bobby Bowden's Florida State Seminoles football team. Bowden later said, "Boy, have you ever thought about (I have!) how many national championships we might have won if we had Janikowski every year of my career?" In three seasons, he amassed a career scoring total of 324 points (3rd all-time for the school).  In 1999, he won the Lou Groza Award for the second year in a row, an honor given annually to the nation's top collegiate kicker. Janikowski is currently the only player to win this award two years in a row. He became popular with fans for being able to placekick a kick-off through the endzone uprights, having done it so often that the stadium monitors would display field goal graphics even though it was a kick-off and not an actual field goal attempt.

Janikowski was first called "Seabass" while playing for FSU. Wide receiver Peter Warrick began calling him Seabass since he said the name Sebastian was too long.

Janikowski's career at FSU was not without incident. In August 1998, he got into a fight outside of a Tallahassee bar and was charged with failure to leave the premises; he pled no contest to the misdemeanor offense. That same year, the night after a season-ending win over rival Florida, Janikowski got into a fight at a local bar and was charged with battery.

In the 1999 season, FSU was again in contention for a national title. Prior to the team's appearance in the national championship game (the 2000 Sugar Bowl in New Orleans, Louisiana), Janikowski declared his intentions to declare himself eligible for the 2000 NFL Draft, saying his primary reason for foregoing his senior year was to pay for his mother to come to the United States. In his final game for FSU, Janikowski converted 5-of-5 PATs and kicked a 32-yard field goal, helping the Seminoles win their second national championship.

Although Janikowski's skill as a kicker was unquestioned by NFL scouts, his off-the-field behavior was a cause of concern. In January 2000, Janikowski was partying with a group of friends when his high school friend was arrested at a nightclub. Janikowski, who later said he was thinking he could save everyone paperwork and the trouble, approached the arresting officer and asked how much it would take to let his friend go. He was then arrested for attempting to bribe an officer, a charge that carried a $5,000 fine, up to five years in prison, and possible deportation. Janikowski claimed that he thought he could pay a fine to have his friend released, but the officer interpreted the action as an attempted bribe.

Professional career

Oakland Raiders
Janikowski was drafted by the Oakland Raiders with the 17th overall pick in the 2000 NFL Draft.

Shortly after the draft, Janikowski was acquitted of his bribery charge. He had testified on his own behalf, stating that he was simply trying to pay his friend's fine (as opposed to bribing the arresting officer). Just eight days after his acquittal, Janikowski and two friends were arrested in Tallahassee on suspicion of felony possession of the drug GHB. Once again, he faced prison time or deportation if convicted, but was acquitted of all charges in April 2001.

Janikowski's professional career got off to a rough start: in 2000, only 68.8% of his field goal attempts were successful. His accuracy improved dramatically in 2001, when 82.1% of his attempts were successful.

Janikowski reached Super Bowl XXXVII with the Raiders in 2002, and kicked an early field goal in the first quarter. His kick briefly gave the Raiders a 3–0 lead over the Tampa Bay Buccaneers. This would be the Raiders' only lead of the game; they lost 48–21.

After the 2004 season, Janikowski was given a five-year contract extension reportedly worth $10.5 million. This made him (at the time) the highest paid kicker in NFL history.
In February 2010, Janikowski extended his contract with the Raiders for $16 million over the next four years, including $9 million in guaranteed money, making him the highest paid placekicker in NFL history.

On September 12, 2011, in a Monday Night Football game against the Denver Broncos, he tied the previous NFL record for the longest field goal at 63 yards.

In 2011 Janikowski received an invite to the Pro Bowl and earned second-team All-Pro honors.

In August 2013, Janikowski signed a four-year contract extension with the Raiders for $19 million over five years, including $8 million guaranteed.

Prior to the 2017 season, he took a pay cut from his $4.05 million base salary to $3 million but it became fully guaranteed. On September 9, 2017, he was placed on injured reserve due to back issues and Giorgio Tavecchio was signed on from the practice squad to temporarily take his place as kicker. On February 14, 2018, it was reported that Janikowski would not be re-signed by the Raiders.

Seattle Seahawks
On April 13, 2018, Janikowski signed a one-year contract with the Seattle Seahawks. He won the Seahawks starting kicking job after the team released Jason Myers on August 20, 2018. In Week 12 against the Carolina Panthers, Janikowski made all three extra points and three field goals, including a 31-yard game winner as the Seahawks won 30–27. He was named the NFC Special Teams Player of the Week for his performance. On January 5, 2019, Janikowski missed a 57-yard field goal against the Dallas Cowboys in the 2019 Wildcard Round of the NFL Playoffs and suffered a hamstring injury on the same missed field goal kick. The kicker position was then left in the hands of rookie Seahawks punter, Michael Dickson, who missed an onside kick that would have potentially put the Seahawks back in position to score and win the game.

Retirement
On April 28, 2019, Janikowski announced his retirement after 19 years in the NFL. He ended his career as the Raiders' all-time leading scorer, with 1,799 points.

NFL career statistics

Records

NFL records
 Longest field goal in overtime: 57 yards
 Most field goals in one quarter: 4 (tied)
 Most field goals of 50+ yards in a career: 58
 Most field goals attempted of 60+ yards in a career: 8
 Most field goals of 50+ yards in one game: 3 (tied with Justin Tucker)
 Most extra points in a Pro Bowl: 8
Longest field goal attempt: 76 yards

Attempts and other records
On October 16, 2003, during the second quarter, Janikowski tied the NFL record by completing 4 field goals in a single quarter.

On November 4, 2007, he attempted to kick a 64-yard record field goal before halftime against the Houston Texans on a windless Oakland afternoon in McAfee Coliseum. If successful, the kick would have broken the all-time NFL field goal record of 63 yards. However, it bounced off the right upright and came back out.

On September 28, 2008, Janikowski unsuccessfully attempted a 76-yard field goal against the San Diego Chargers into the heavy wind right before halftime. This is presumed to be the longest attempt in NFL history; though the league keeps no such records on attempts, the longest known attempts previous to this were 74 yard attempts by Mark Moseley and Joe Danelo in 1979.

On October 19, 2008, Janikowski broke his own Raiders team record, making a 57-yard field goal in overtime to defeat the New York Jets, 16–13, the longest overtime field goal in NFL history. On December 27, 2009, he again broke his own team record by kicking a 61-yard field goal against the Cleveland Browns before halftime. On December 26, 2010, Janikowski converted a 59-yard field goal in the second quarter of a home game against the Indianapolis Colts making him the second player with two 59+ yard field goals (Morten Andersen). On January 3, 2010, he reached his 1,000th career point with a 39-yard field goal against the Baltimore Ravens. He is the highest-scoring player in Raiders history.

On September 12, 2011, as a rainy first half against the Denver Broncos came to a close, Janikowski made a 63-yard field goal and tied the NFL record set by Tom Dempsey in 1970 and previously tied by Jason Elam (1998) and afterwards by David Akers (2012), but which was subsequently broken by Matt Prater of the Denver Broncos and Justin Tucker of the Baltimore Ravens. On November 27, 2011, in a game against the Chicago Bears, he made 6 field goals of 40, 47, 42, 19, 37, and 44 yards to break the team record of most field goals in a single game. He attempted a record-breaking 65-yard field goal on December 18, 2011, against the Detroit Lions, but Ndamukong Suh blocked it to end the game.

Notes

References

External links

 
 
 Oakland Raiders biography
 Legal history

1978 births
Living people
People from Wałbrzych
Sportspeople from Alameda County, California
Sportspeople from Lower Silesian Voivodeship
Polish emigrants to the United States
Polish players of American football
American football placekickers
Seabreeze High School alumni
Florida State Seminoles football players
All-American college football players
Oakland Raiders players
Seattle Seahawks players
Footballers who switched code
Polish footballers
Association footballers not categorized by position
Orlando Lions players
Poland youth international footballers
American Conference Pro Bowl players